The Ottawa Citizen is an English-language daily newspaper owned by Postmedia Network in Ottawa, Ontario, Canada.

History 

Established as The Bytown Packet in 1845 by William Harris, it was renamed the Citizen in 1851. The newspaper's original motto, which has recently been returned to the editorial page, was Fair play and Day-Light.

The paper has been through a number of owners. In 1846, Harris sold the paper to John Bell and Henry J. Friel. Robert Bell bought the paper in 1849. In 1877, Charles Herbert Mackintosh, the editor under Robert Bell, became publisher. In 1879, it became one of several papers owned by the Southam family. It remained under Southam until the chain was purchased by Conrad Black's Hollinger Inc. In 2000, Black sold most of his Canadian holdings, including the flagship National Post to CanWest Global.

The editorial view of the Citizen has varied with its ownership, taking a reform, anti-Tory position under Harris and a conservative position under Bell. As part of Southam, it moved to the left, supporting the Liberals largely in opposition to the Progressive Conservative Party's support of free trade in the late 1980s. Under Black, it moved to the right and became a supporter of the Reform Party. In 2002, its publisher Russell Mills was dismissed following the publication of a story critical of Prime Minister Jean Chrétien and an editorial calling for Chrétien's resignation. It endorsed the Conservative Party of Canada in the 2006 federal election.

It published its last Sunday edition on July 15, 2012. The move cut 20 newsroom jobs, and was part of a series of changes made by Postmedia.

The pre-2014 logo depicted the top of the Peace Tower of the city's Parliament Buildings. In 2014, the newspaper adopted a new logo showing the paper's name over an outline of the Peace Tower roof on a green background.

Circulation 
Like most Canadian daily newspapers, the Ottawa Citizen has seen a decline in circulation in recent years. Its total circulation dropped by  percent to 91,796 copies daily from 2009 to 2015.

Daily average

Sections

Daily 

 News
 World
 City
 Sports
 Arts
 Business

Weekly 

 Food
 Driving
 Technology
 Homes & Condos

Notable staff
 Bob Ferguson (1931–2014), sports journalist and writer
 Eddie MacCabe (1927–1998), journalist, sports editor and writer

See also
List of newspapers in Canada

References

Sources 
 Adam, Mohammed. (January 2, 2005). "When we began 1845: For 160 years, the Citizen has been the 'heartbeat of the community". Ottawa Citizen.
 
 
   DDC 71.1.   LCC PN4907.

External links 

 
 Official mobile version
 Canadian Newspaper Association
 The Ottawa Citizen Birth Marriage, Anniversary, Death and Memoriam Notices 1879-1885
 Google News Archive microfilm archive 1853–1987

Newspapers published in Ottawa
Postmedia Network publications
Publications established in 1845
Daily newspapers published in Ontario
1845 establishments in Canada